Jan Gratama (16 August 1877  – 12 December 1947), was a Dutch architect.

Biography
He was born in Groningen and was the younger brother of the artist and museum director Gerrit David Gratama. His sister Lina Gratama (1875-1946) was a painter  He studied at the Polytechnical School of Delft and became an amateur portrait artist like his older brother. He was an artistic advisor to his sister Lina, who also became a portrait artist, and became known for her copies of the works in the Mauritshuis and the Gemeentemuseum Den Haag.

In 1908 he established an architecture bureau in Amsterdam, where he worked with Berlage and others in the style of the Amsterdam School. His partners in his architect bureau were Gerrit Versteeg from 1914 and Jan Willem Dinger from 1930, who continued the bureau after Gratama died in 1947.

Works in Amsterdam

References

External links 

Jan Gratama in the Netherlands Architecture Institute

1877 births
1947 deaths
Dutch architects
People from Groningen (city)